Hugo Rolando Caballero Martínez (born 14 November 1974) is a retired Honduran footballer.

Club career
Caballero played as a goalkeeper and spent the majority of his career with F.C. Motagua, making his debut on 15 November 1997 against Victoria. He also played for  Olimpia, Marathón, Atlético Olanchano and Vida who released him in May 2008. He then finished his career at Deportes Savio.

International career
He made his debut for Honduras in a November 1998 friendly match against El Salvador and has earned a total of 8 caps, scoring no goals. He has represented his country at the 1999 and 2001 UNCAF Nations Cups as well as at the 2000 CONCACAF Gold Cup, but he only actually played at the 2001 tournament.

His final international was a May 2001 UNCAF Nations Cup match against El Salvador.

Statistics

References

External links

1974 births
Living people
People from Tela
Association football goalkeepers
Honduran footballers
Honduras international footballers
F.C. Motagua players
C.D. Olimpia players
C.D. Marathón players
C.D.S. Vida players
Deportes Savio players
Liga Nacional de Fútbol Profesional de Honduras players
2000 CONCACAF Gold Cup players
2001 UNCAF Nations Cup players